José Luis Valle Magaña (born 26 September 1959) is a Mexican politician affiliated with the Convergence. He served as Deputy of the LXII Legislature of the Mexican Congress representing Jalisco, and previously served as municipal president of Arandas, Jalisco.

References

1959 births
Living people
Citizens' Movement (Mexico) politicians
21st-century Mexican politicians
Deputies of the LXII Legislature of Mexico
Members of the Chamber of Deputies (Mexico) for Jalisco
Municipal presidents in Jalisco
Politicians from Jalisco
People from Arandas, Jalisco